Detained in Dubai is a London-based organisation founded in 2008 by Radha Stirling, which states its aim is to help foreigners abroad.

Detained in Dubai was founded when Cat Le-Huy, a colleague of Stirling's from Endemol, was arrested in the UAE. Stirling led the legal team and media that ended with Le-Huy's release. Following the international press coverage of the case, Stirling was asked by others for assistance.

Cases and causes
Detained in Dubai has represented businessmen and celebrities including Matt Joyce and Marcus Lee, Safi Qarashi, Sheikha Latifa, Artur Ligeska, Andy Neal, Jamie Harron, Billy Barclay, Ellie Holman, Laleh Shahravesh, David Oliver, Hervé Jaubert, Mohammed Haddad, Oussama El Omari, Richard Lau, Khater Massaad, Oussama El Omari, Peter Clark, Jihad Quzmar, Conor Howard, Robert Urwin, Alan Stevenson, Pancho Campo, André Gauthier, Hind Albalooki, Roxanne Hillier, Danielle Jeffries, Nichole Coffel, Ali Issa Ahmad, Dieter Kellouche, Perry Coppins, Tracy Wilkinson, Derrin Crawford, Andy Neal, Farzan Athari, Morag Koussa, Melissa McBurnie, Christopher Renehan, Conor Howard, Billy Hood, Albert Douglas, Sheikha Zeynab and Brian Glendinning.

Princess Latifa 
In March 2018, Detained in Dubai responded to requests for help from Latifa bint Mohammed al-Maktoum, a princess and daughter of the prime minister of the United Arab Emirates (UAE) who was abducted by masked armed men off a boat near Goa on 4 March 2018. , Latifa's location was unknown, but in December 2018, the “troubled girl” was reported to be in the care of her family by Mary Robinson, former United Nations High Commissioner for Human Rights, after a meeting with Latifa's step-mother Princess Haya. Robinson was publicly criticised by Detained in Dubai and Human Rights Watch; in February 2021, Robinson retracted her statement, claiming she and Haya had been misled by the Dubai royal family.

In April 2019, Detained in Dubai attracted media attention to the case of Laleh Shahravesh, a British citizen who was arrested in Dubai for having called her ex-husband an "idiot" and her ex-husband's new wife a "horse" in a Facebook post. According to Detained in Dubai, Shahravesh had risked a two-year prison sentence and a  fine for her "horseplay".

Controversial partnerships and cases 

Shahid Bolsen

Shahid King Bolsen became involved with the company after Detained In Dubai took up his case in 2012. Bolsen admitted to killing a German engineer he met online in 2006 and escaped from prison. Bolsen has been accused of inciting violence against Americans and American businesses in Egypt as recent as 2015 which he denied in an interview with Radha Stirling.

According to The New York times, Bolsen is quoted as saying "The idea is disruption without bloodshed, I condemn the loss of life and the use of violence against people", he said. But, he added, if a few lives are lost to help prevent needless deaths at the hands of security forces, "sometimes it is a price to be paid."

Ellie Holman

In August 2018, Swedish-Iranian Ellie Holman was charged with having alcohol in her blood after drinking one complimentary glass of wine on an Emirates flight prior to her arrival in Dubai. Radha Stirling of Detained in Dubai alleged that "the UAE maintains a deliberately misleading facade that alcohol consumption is perfectly legal for visitors." According to Detained in Dubai, the UAE presented that she had been detained for visa-related issues, though the official prosecution charge provided that she had been arrested for the consumption of alcohol and invading the privacy of an officer. Detained in Dubai has campaigned for legislative reforms to prevent further such arrests.

In response, Emirates released a statement clarifying that alcohol consumption is not prohibited on their flights and alcohol is served in the lounges in the Dubai International Airport and is available for purchase in the duty-free area of the airport. A statement from attorney General of Dubai was released detailing that Holman attempted to enter Dubai using an expired Swedish passport and was held for less than 24 hours and then deported due to profanity and photographing a government official in a restricted area. Holman later stated that she had been held due to a "visa mistake". The original story was criticized by Dubai for being "fake news." by the UAE government controlled media

See also
 Prisoners Abroad, UK charity supporting British persons imprisoned abroad

References

External links
 Official website
 Official facebook page
 Official news page

Enforced disappearance
Migrant crises
Human rights organisations based in the United Kingdom
Law of the United Arab Emirates